is a feminine Japanese given name. Although the name is always romanized the same way, the kanji characters can be different.

Possible writings
 信子, "trust, child"
 伸子, "to lengthen, child"
 延子, "to prolong, child"
 暢子, "extend/stretch, relax/child"
 宜子, "good, child"

People
 Nobuko Albery, a Japanese author, theatrical producer and the widow of English theatrical impresario, Sir Donald Albery
 Princess Nobuko (Japanese romanization: Fumi-no-miya Nobuko Naishinnō, 富美宮允子内親王), the 8th daughter of Emperor Meiji
 Nobuko Asō (麻生信子), later Princess Tomohito of Mikasa (寛仁親王妃信子)
 Nobuko Fukuda (福田 修子), Japanese cross-country skier
 Nobuko Imai (今井 信子), a Japanese classical violist and chamber musician
 Nobuko Iwaki (井脇 ノブ子), Japanese politician of the Liberal Democratic Party, a member of the House of Representatives in the Diet
, Japanese writer
 Nobuko Miyamoto (宮本信子), a Japanese actress
, Japanese architect
 Nobuko Okashita (岡下 信子), a Japanese politician of the Liberal Democratic Party, and a member of the House of Representatives in the Diet
 , Japanese rower
 Nobuko Otowa (乙羽 信子), a Japanese actress
 Nobuko Takagi (高樹 のぶ子), the pen name of Nobuko Tsuruta, a Japanese author
 Nobuko Tsuchiya (土屋 信子), Japanese artist
, Japanese speed skater
, Japanese computer scientist
 Nobuko Yoshiya (吉屋信子), a Japanese novelist who was active in the Taishō and Shōwa periods of Japan

Fictional characters
 Nobuko Ishihara (石原信子), a character in the manga Love Com
 Nobuko Kotani (小谷 信子), the titular character of the Japanese television drama Nobuta wo Produce
 Nobuko Komiyama (小宮山信子), the titular character of the film Nobuko (1940 film), one of many adaptations of a novel by Bunroku Shishi

Japanese feminine given names